Augangela is a genus of moths in the family Sesiidae.

Species
Augangela xanthomias Meyrick, 1932

References

Sesiidae